North-East Fife was one of three local government districts in the Fife region of Scotland from 1975 - 1996.

The district was formed by the local Government (Scotland) Act 1973 from part of the former county of Fife, namely:

The burghs of Auchtermuchty, Crail, Cupar, Elie and Earlsferry, Falkland, Kilrenny, Anstruther Easter and Anstruther Wester, Ladybank, Newburgh, Newport-on-Tay, Pittenweem, St Andrews, St Monans and Tayport.
The districts of Cupar and St Andrews.

The council's headquarters were at Cupar.

The district was abolished by the Local Government etc. (Scotland) Act 1994 in 1996, when the region and three districts were replaced by the unitary Fife council area.

The area is covered by the North East Fife (UK Parliament constituency).

Electoral history

District result maps

See also
Subdivisions of Scotland

Districts of Scotland
Politics of Fife